The Stych Baronetcy, of Newbury in the County of Essex, was a title in the Baronetage of England.  It was created on 8 October 1687 for William Stych.  The title became extinct on the death of the second Baronet in 1725.

Stych baronets, of Newbury (1687)

Sir William Stych, 1st Baronet (died 1697)
Sir Richard Stych, 2nd Baronet (died 1725)

References

Extinct baronetcies in the Baronetage of England